Windsor Herald of Arms in Ordinary is an officer of arms at the College of Arms in London.

It has been suggested that the office was instituted specifically for the Order of the Garter in 1348, or that it predates the Order and was in use as early as 1338. However, it is more likely that it dates from 1364, when a pursuivant of Edward III, on bringing the king news of the victory at Auray, was rewarded by promotion to the rank of herald with the title Windsor. Thereafter there is little mention of the office before 1419, when Windsor Herald was sent to the Duke of Brittany. Since that time, the office has been maintained. The badge of office is the sunburst badge of Edward III (Edward of Windsor) royally crowned.

The best-known Windsor Herald was the 17th-century antiquarian, Elias Ashmole. The current Windsor Herald of Arms in Ordinary is John Allen-Petrie, Esq.

Holders of the office

See also
 Heraldry
 Officer of Arms

References
Citations

Bibliography
 The College of Arms, Queen Victoria Street : being the sixteenth and final monograph of the London Survey Committee, Walter H. Godfrey, assisted by Sir Anthony Wagner, with a complete list of the officers of arms, prepared by H. Stanford London, (London, 1963)
 A History of the College of Arms &c, Mark Noble, (London, 1804)

External links
 The College of Arms
 CUHGS Officer of Arms Index

Windsor, Berkshire
Offices of the College of Arms